The 2018 Asian Games closing ceremony was held on Sunday, 2 September 2018 at the Gelora Bung Karno Main Stadium in Jakarta. It began at 19:00 Indonesia Western Time (UTC+7) and ended at 21:25 local time. Like the opening ceremony, host event broadcasting company International Games Broadcast Services (IGBS) broadcast the ceremony live internationally. Vice President of Indonesia Jusuf Kalla, president of International Olympic Committee Thomas Bach, and president of Olympic Council of Asia Sheikh Ahmad Al-Fahad Al-Sabah were among the dignitaries in attendance.

President of Indonesia Joko Widodo, accompanied by then-West Nusa Tenggara Governor Muhammad Zainul Majdi, addressed the ceremony via teleconference from an emergency shelter in Lombok, where a string of earthquakes struck four weeks earlier. Vice President Kalla delivered a bilingual speech, while Sheikh Al-Sabah officially closed the Games. Through the president of the Chinese Olympic Committee Gou Zhongwen, Mayor of Hangzhou Xu Liyi received the Games torch, the first Games flag and the OCA flag from Jakarta Governor Anies Baswedan, South Sumatra Governor Alex Noerdin, and Coordinating Minister for Human Development and Cultural Affairs Puan Maharani, respectively. Hangzhou-born and raised multinational holding conglomerate Alibaba founder Jack Ma and Hangzhou-born and raised gold medal-winning swimmer Sun Yang promoted their birth city Hangzhou, as the city will host the 2022 Asian Games.

Performing artists
The closing ceremony featured tattoo-style performance from Indonesian National Armed Forces and Indonesian National Police Academy Drum Corps. In addition to local artists and a Chinese segment involving traditional dance and music, the South Korean boybands Super Junior and iKon, and Indian singer Sidharth Slathia performed in the ceremony.

Below is the list of artists who performed during the ceremony.

Indonesian artists
 Isyana Sarasvati 
 Bams and Lea Simanjuntak 
 GIGI 
 Denada 
 Siti Badriah 
 Jevin Julian and Winky Wiryawan 
 RAN 
 Bunga Citra Lestari 
 JFlow 
 Dira Sugandi 
 Alffy Rev, Irfan of "Samsons," and Ade of "Govinda" 
 Afgansyah Reza

Foreign artists
  Jackson Yee 
  Sidharth Slathia 
  iKON 
  Super Junior

Notable guests

Indonesians
 Jusuf Kalla, Vice President of Indonesia and Indonesia Asian Games Organizing Committee (INASGOC) steering committee chairman
 Mufidah Mi'ad Saad, Second Lady of Indonesia
 Megawati Sukarnoputri, former president (and previously vice president) of Indonesia
 Sinta Nuriyah, former First Lady of Indonesia, and her daughter Yenny Wahid
 Try Sutrisno, former Vice President of Indonesia
 Tuti Sutiawati, former Second Lady of Indonesia
 Imam Nahrawi, Youth and Sports Minister of Indonesia
 Retno Marsudi, Foreign Minister of Indonesia
 Darmin Nasution, Coordinating Minister for Economic Affairs of Indonesia
 Puan Maharani, Coordinating Minister for Human Development and Cultural Affairs of Indonesia and INASGOC steering committee first vice chairwoman
 Luhut Binsar Pandjaitan, Coordinating Minister for Maritime Affairs of Indonesia
 Sri Mulyani Indrawati, Finance Minister of Indonesia
 Syafruddin, Minister of State Apparatus Utilization and Bureaucratic Reform of Indonesia and chef de mission of the Indonesian contingent
 Eko Putro Sandjojo, Minister of Village, Underdeveloped Regions Development, and Transmigration Affairs of Indonesia
 Mohamad Oemar, head of the Vice-Presidential Secretariat of Indonesia
 Rita Subowo, Vice President of the Olympic Council of Asia for the 2018 Asian Games and 2021 Asian Youth Games
 Erick Thohir, INASGOC and Indonesian Olympic Committee chairman
 Anies Baswedan, Governor of Jakarta and INASGOC steering committee member
 Alex Noerdin, Governor of South Sumatra and INASGOC steering committee member

Foreign dignitaries
 Thomas Bach, president of the International Olympic Committee
 Ahmed Al-Fahad Al-Ahmed Al-Sabah, president of the Olympic Council of Asia
 Gou Zhongwen, president of the Chinese Olympic Committee and director of the State General Administration of Sports of China
 Xu Liyi, Mayor of Hangzhou, China

See also 
 2018 Asian Para Games opening and closing ceremonies

References

2018 Asian Games
Ceremonies in Indonesia
Closing ceremonies at multi-sport events